Phantassie is an agricultural hamlet near East Linton, East Lothian, Scotland. It is close to the River Tyne, Preston Mill, and Prestonkirk Parish Church.

The  Phantassie Farm and Workshop, presently owned by Hamilton Farmers, is the birthplace and childhood home of the civil engineer John Rennie the Elder (1761–1821), and his brother George Rennie (1749–1828). John Rennie is commemorated at Phantassie by balusters taken from Waterloo Bridge in London, which he designed. The estate was formerly the property of the Countess of Aberdeen, until purchased by the Rennie family in the 18th century. The 18th century main house is a category A listed building, while the farmstead is category B listed.

Phantassie Doocot
Phantassie Doocot is a "beehive" doocot, or dovecote, and is a National Trust for Scotland property, along with the nearby Preston Mill. It was built in the 16th century, and has an unusual parapet in the shape of a horseshoe. The building was given to the National Trust for Scotland in 1961 by William Hamilton of Phantassie Farm, and is a category A listed building.

Phantassie walled garden has been used for over 150 years and is dedicated to the rearing of Gloucester and Berkshire pigs, as well as Black Rock hens and organic produce.

Photo gallery

References

External links

National Trust for Scotland webpage for Phantassie Doocot
Family life at Phantassie in the mid-1870s
Aerial photos of Phantassie from RCAHMS

Villages in East Lothian
Tourist attractions in East Lothian
History of East Lothian
Category A listed buildings in East Lothian
Dovecotes